Eupsilia fringata is a species of cutworm or dart moth in the family Noctuidae first described by William Barnes and James Halliday McDunnough in 1916. It is found in North America.

The MONA or Hodges number for Eupsilia fringata is 9938.

References

Further reading

 
 
 

Eupsilia
Articles created by Qbugbot
Moths described in 1916